This was the first edition of the tournament.

Guy Forget and Yannick Noah won the title, defeating Kelly Jones and David Pate 4–6, 6–3, 6–4 in the final.

Seeds

  Guy Forget /  Yannick Noah (champions)
  Kelly Jones /  David Pate (final)
  Peter Lundgren /  Joakim Nyström (semifinals)
  Michael Mortensen /  Todd Nelson (quarterfinals)

Draw

Draw

External links
Draw

1987 Grand Prix (tennis)